Sahar Zaman may refer to:

 Sahar Zaman (journalist), Indian art journalist and curator, newscaster, lecturer and jewelry designer
 Sahar Zaman (footballer) (born 1996), Pakistani footballer